Future Girls is the second album by Swedish Eurodance group Smile.dk, released in 2000. The song "Dancing All Alone" was featured in the video game Dance Dance Revolution 5thMIX. Tracks from this album are featured on several Dancemania megamix albums, including Dancemania X7, X8 Hyper Delux, and Delux 5.

Track listing
 "Future Girls" – 3:35
 "Doo-Be-Di-Boy" – 3:12
 "Hollywood" – 3:20
 "Counting on You" – 4:18
 "Dancing All Alone" – 3:09
 "Together" – 3:15
 "Heal My Broken Heart" – 3:43
 "Kissy Kissy" – 3:05
 "Love & Devotion" – 3:34
 "Don't Let Go" – 3:30
 "Dragonfly" – 3:18
 "Do You?" – 3:18

Japanese bonus tracks
 "Someday" – 3:06
 "Dancing All Alone" (Kimono remix) – 3:10

References

2000 albums
Smile.dk albums